The Babatag Range is a mountain range of Tajikistan. It lies in the west of Tajikistan, south of Hisor. It was where the Caspian Tiger was last seen, in 1998 .

References

Mountain ranges of Tajikistan